Janet Stephanie Francis (born 5 August 1947) is an English actress.  She appeared as Penny Warrender in the 1980s romantic comedy Just Good Friends.

Early life
Francis was born at the former Charing Cross Hospital London. She is the eldest child of Frank Francis, a clerical officer with the Agricultural Society, and Marjorie (née Watling), an employment agent, who were married in 1944. She was brought up in Streatham and was educated at the Lady Edridge Grammar School.

After training as a dancer at the Royal Ballet Senior School from which she graduated in 1965, Francis performed with the Royal Ballet Touring Company in Britain, in the rest of Europe and the United States. Francis left the Royal Ballet in September 1969 to pursue an acting career.

Acting
Francis made the transfer to becoming an actress through choreography, and performed with the Cheltenham Repertory Company between 1969 and 1970. She first appeared on television in 1971, before landing BBC Television drama roles including Kschessinska in Fall of Eagles and Lisa Colbert in Secret Army (1977–78). She appeared in Dracula (1979) as Mina Van Helsing with Laurence Olivier as Abraham Van Helsing.

She played the part of Susie Dean in Alan Plater's adaptation of the J. B. Priestley novel The Good Companions (1980) which was produced by Yorkshire Television. Writer John Sullivan met Francis and later created her best-known part, Penny Warrender, in the 1980s BBC sitcom Just Good Friends.

She later co-starred with Dennis Waterman as Sally Hardcastle in the 1989–1992 ITV drama series Stay Lucky. This was followed by an appearance in Heartbeat in 1993, in which she played Vivienne Keen in the episode Love Hurts.. She also played Nick's "old enough to be his mother" girlfriend in the sitcom My Family.

During the late 1980s and early 1990s, she starred in the Lloyds Bank television commercials alongside Nigel Havers and Leo McKern.

In 2006, she guest starred in ITV prison drama Bad Girls as interior designer Catherine Earlham, who was sent to Larkhall on remand for embezzlement. The character played a key role in the exit storyline for fellow inmate Darlene Cake (Antonia Okonma). She is also a regular performer, and part of the original cast, of the touring play Seven Deadly Sins Four Deadly Sinners.

In 2009, she appeared as Julia in the second series of Mistresses on BBC1. In November 2009, she starred in the ITV drama Collision. She also played a love interest for Rodney Blackstock in ITV soap opera Emmerdale, in 2010.

In April 2014, she made a guest appearance as a patient in the BBC hospital drama series Casualty.

Personal life
Francis married the actor-writer Martin Thurley in Newton Abbot on 1 August 1977; he writes using the pseudonym Thomas Ellice. They have two daughters and reside in Woodchurch, Kent.

Selected filmography

Theatre 
 The Sleeping Beauty (1969) ... Royal Ballet (1969)
 The Farmer's Wife (1969) ... Cheltenham Repertory Company, as Susan Maine
 Sleeping Beauty (1969–1970) ... Pantomime, as Fairy Dreamawhile
 The Boyfriend (1970) ... as Maisie (& Lolita)
 When Did You Last See My Mother (1970) ... at The Theatre Upstairs at the Royal Court, as Linda
 Cinderella (1970) ... at the Manchester Opera House
 Play It Again Sam (1971) ... at the New Theatre, Bromley as one of Barbara and the Dream Girls
 The Heiress (1971) ... as Marian Almond
 Romance! (1971) ... at the Duke of York's Theatre, London as Lotte
 Out of Bounds (1973) ... Bristol Old Vic Company as Ermyntrude Johnson
 Lend Me A Tenor (1986) ... at the Globe Theatre, London as Maggie
 Hay Fever (1988) ... at the Chichester Festival Theatre as Myra Arundel
 'Dear Ralph' A Valentine's Day Gala (1993) ... at the London Palladium as a Host for the Evening
 Seven Deadly Sins Four Deadly Sinners (2004–2008) ... at various theatres on tour
 An Evening at Le Candide (2006) ... at the King's Head Theatre, London

References

External links

1947 births
Living people
English ballerinas
English stage actresses
English television actresses
Actresses from London
People from Westminster
People from Woodchurch, Kent
Audiobook narrators